At least two ships of the French Navy have been named Typhon:

 , a  launched in 1901. 
 , a  launched in 1925 and scuttled in 1942.

French Navy ship names